Andrés David Saldarriaga Cardona (born 18 September 1978) is a Colombian goalkeeper who plays for Boyacá Chicó in the Copa Mustang. He was born in Medellín, Colombia.

Club career
Saldarriaga previously played for Deportes Quindío, Atlético Nacional, where he went on loan to Cúcuta Deportivo and Once Caldas.

International career
Saldarriaga was a member of the Colombia U-23 National Team. He was called into the senior squad for the CONMEBOL qualifiers for the 2002 FIFA World Cup, but did not appear in any matches.

References

Profile at GolGolGol.net

1978 births
Living people
Footballers from Medellín
Association football goalkeepers
Colombian footballers
Deportes Quindío footballers
Atlético Nacional footballers
Cúcuta Deportivo footballers
Once Caldas footballers
Envigado F.C. players
Boyacá Chicó F.C. footballers